Zaira is a genus of parasitic flies in the family Tachinidae.  Larvae are parasitoids of adult beetles.

Species
Zaira adscripta (Wulp, 1890)
Zaira angustifrons (Reinhard, 1930)
Zaira argentina (Townsend, 1931)
Zaira arrisor (Reinhard, 1959)
Zaira aurigera (Coquillett, 1895)
Zaira calosomae (Townsend, 1916)
Zaira cinerea (Fallén, 1810)
Zaira duplaris (Reinhard, 1964)
Zaira eleodivora (Walton, 1918)
Zaira flavipes (Thompson, 1968)
Zaira georgiae (Brauer & von Bergenstamm, 1891)
Zaira grisea (Thompson, 1968)
Zaira lateralis (Curran, 1925)
Zaira leechi (Curran, 1932)
Zaira medeola (Reinhard, 1961)
Zaira mutabilis (Coquillett, 1904)
Zaira neomexicana (Townsend, 1892)
Zaira nocturnalis (Reinhard, 1930)
Zaira nubecula (Wulp, 1890)
Zaira robusta (Wulp, 1890)
Zaira sordicolor (Townsend, 1891)
Zaira sordida (Walker, 1853)
Zaira sublucens (Wulp, 1890)

References

Diptera of Asia
Diptera of Europe
Diptera of North America
Diptera of South America
Exoristinae
Tachinidae genera
Taxa named by Jean-Baptiste Robineau-Desvoidy